Melvin Johnson  (born April 15, 1972) is a former American football safety in the National Football League (NFL). After graduating from St. Xavier High School in 1990 and playing college football for the Kentucky Wildcats, he was drafted by the Tampa Bay Buccaneers in the second round of the 1995 NFL Draft. Johnson later played for the Kansas City Chiefs in 1998.

References

1972 births
Living people
American football safeties
Kentucky Wildcats football players
Tampa Bay Buccaneers players
Kansas City Chiefs players
St. Xavier High School (Ohio) alumni
African-American players of American football
Players of American football from Cincinnati
21st-century African-American sportspeople
20th-century African-American sportspeople